Antifreeze may refer to:

Antifreeze, engine coolant or coolant additive
Antifreeze, agent for de-icing outdoor surfaces

See also 
 Antifreeze protein
 Cryoprotectant